"Back in the Fire" is a song written by Mike Reid and Rory Bourke, and recorded by American country music artist Gene Watson.  It was released in March 1989 as the second single and title track from the album Back in the Fire.  The song reached #20 on the Billboard Hot Country Singles & Tracks chart.

Chart performance

References

1989 singles
Gene Watson songs
Songs written by Rory Bourke
Songs written by Mike Reid (singer)
Song recordings produced by Paul Worley
Warner Records singles
1989 songs